Hunter Doherty "Patch" Adams (born May 28, 1945) is an American physician, comedian, social activist, clown, and author. He founded the Gesundheit! Institute in 1971. Each year he also organizes volunteers from around the world to travel to various countries where they dress as clowns to bring humor to orphans, patients, and other people.

Adams is currently based in Urbana, Illinois. In collaboration with the institute, he promotes an alternative health care model not funded by insurance policies.

Early life
Adams was born in Washington, D.C., the son of Anna Campbell Stewart (née Hunter) and Robert Loughridge Adams. His maternal grandfather, Thomas Lomax Hunter, was a Poet Laureate of Virginia. His father, a United States Army officer who fought in Korea, died while stationed in Germany when Adams was only 16. After his father's death, Adams returned to the United States with his mother and brother. Adams has stated that upon his return he encountered racism and segregation amongst his peers against which he stood up, and this made him a target for bullies at school. As a result, Adams was unhappy and became actively suicidal. After a third hospitalization in one year he decided "you don't kill yourself, stupid; you make revolution."

Early career
After graduating in 1963 from Wakefield High School, Adams completed pre-med coursework at George Washington University. He began medical school without an undergraduate degree, and earned his Doctor of Medicine degree at Virginia Commonwealth University (Medical College of Virginia) in 1971. In the late 1960s one of his closest friends was murdered by a deranged patient. Convinced of the powerful connection between environment and wellness, he believes the health of an individual cannot be separated from the health of the family, community, and the world.

Gesundheit! Institute

Soon after graduation, Patch, his wife, Linda, and friends founded the Gesundheit! Institute (originally as the Zanies), which ran as a communal "home" from 1971 to 1984. Based in Adams' rural West Virginia property, the Institute has since been devoted to fundraising. The latest plan is for a 44 bed community hospital building that will offer free holistic care to "anyone who wants it," along with a teaching facility that can accommodate "120 staff, all living together in our communal ecovillage."  

Fees from the 1999 movie "made it possible to build three beautiful buildings...in preparation for the big buildings we want for the hospital." These are a farmhouse, workshop, and dacha that accommodate the workshops and courses offered by the Institute. The educational philosophy is contained in their "School for Designing a Society (SDaS) - for people who want to change society by means of desire, design, and composition..." and includes courses on caring and workshops on clowning. 

Adams was awarded the Peace Abbey Courage of Conscience Award on January 29, 1997.

In 2008, Adams agreed to become honorary chair of the "International Association for the Advancement of Creative Maladjustment" or IAACM. MindFreedom International, a nonprofit coalition that Gesundheit! belongs to as a sponsor group, launched the IAACM to support "creative maladjustment" and social change.

Since the 1990s Adams has supported the Ithaca Health Alliance (IHA), founded as the Ithaca Health Fund (IHF) by Paul Glover. In January 2006 IHA launched the Ithaca Free Clinic, bringing to life key aspects of Adams's vision. Adams has also given strong praise to Health Democracy, Glover's book written and published the same year.

As of 2016, Adams claims to "lecture 300 days out of the year, and have done so for over 30 years in 81 countries, spreading seeds of a love revolution of enlivening community and a call to end capitalism."

In media

The 1998 film Patch Adams was based on Adams's life and his views on medicine. Adams has heavily criticized the film, saying it eschewed an accurate representation of his beliefs in favor of commercial viability. He said that out of all aspects of his life and activism, the film portrayed him merely as a funny doctor. Patch Adams also said of Robin Williams in an interview, "He made $21 million for four months of pretending to be me, in a very simplistic version, and did not give $10 to my free hospital. Patch Adams, the person, would have, if I had Robin's money, given all $21 million to a free hospital in a country where 80 million cannot get care."

In another interview, Adams clarified that he did not dislike Williams saying, "I think Robin himself is compassionate, generous and funny. I like to think that that's who I am, and so I think he was the only actor I wanted to play me, and I think he did a fabulous job." Williams also had actively supported St. Jude Children's Research Hospital for several years.

Upon hearing of the death of Williams, Adams released a statement that praised Williams' comedic and improvisational skills on set; noted his compassionate and caring nature; remarked upon his introverted demeanour in private, and his desire for solitude; and thanked him for "his wonderful performance."

As a speaker, Adams travels around the globe lecturing about his medicine methods.

Personal life
While working in an adolescent clinic at MCV, in his final year of med school, he met Linda Edquist, a fellow VCU student who volunteered in the clinic. Adams and Edquist married in 1975 and had two sons, Atomic Zagnut "Zag" Adams and Lars Zig Edquist Adams; they divorced in 1998.

In March 2021, Adams announced that his left foot had been amputated in a below-the-knee amputation due to persistent problems from an MRSA infection.

Publications

Patch Adams wrote forewords for books by Pamela Wible (2012), Pet Goats & Pap Smears: 101 Medical Adventures to Open Your Heart & Mind  and by Diana Leafe Christian (2003), Creating a Life Together: Practical Tools to Grow Ecovillages and Intentional Communities .

Bibliography
 4 sound cassettes (ca. 6 hr.) : digitally mastered, Dolby processed.

 1 videocassette (53 min.) : sd., col. ; 1/2 in.

See also
Slow medicine
Narrative medicine
Clown Care
Humor research

References

External links

13-minute video interview: "Patch Adams Presents: His Clown Character"

1945 births
Living people
American health activists
American humanitarians
Columbian College of Arts and Sciences alumni
Humor researchers
Medical College of Virginia alumni
People from Arlington County, Virginia
Physicians from Illinois
Physicians from Washington, D.C.
American amputees